The 1977 James Madison Dukes football team was an American football team that represented James Madison University during the 1977 NCAA Division III football season as an independent. Led by sixth-year head coach Challace McMillin, the Dukes compiled a record of 5–5.

Schedule

References 

James Madison
James Madison Dukes football seasons
James Madison Dukes football